Yelovki is a rural locality (a village) in Andreyevskoye Rural Settlement, Alexandrovsky District, Vladimir Oblast, Russia. The population was 1 in 2010.

Geography 
Godunovo is the nearest rural locality.

References 

Rural localities in Alexandrovsky District, Vladimir Oblast